Heterosminthurus is a genus of springtails belonging to the family Bourletiellidae.

The species of this genus are found in Europe and Northern America.

Species:
 Heterosminthurus bilineatus (Bourlet, 1842) 
 Heterosminthurus chaetocephalus Huther, 1971

References

Collembola